Lustre Parfait is a studio album by Gord Downie and Bob Rock, slated for release May 5, 2023 on Arts & Crafts Productions. The second posthumous album of previously-unreleased material following Downie's death in 2017, the album features songs Downie and Rock created together in the 2010s after Rock produced The Tragically Hip's albums World Container and We Are the Same.

It was known prior to Downie's death that he had recorded a solo album with Rock, although plans for its release had not been announced by the time of Downie's illness and death.

The album's title track was released in October 2022 as a preview. In November, "The Raven and the Red-Tailed Hawk" was released as the title track of a three-song EP that also included "Lustre Parfait" and the song "Is There Nowhere"; in February 2023, "The Moment Is a Wild Place" was released as the lead track of a six-song preview EP, which also featured all three of the already-released songs as well as the album tracks "Something More" and "Camaro".

Rock described working with Downie on the album's songs as one of the great highlights of his professional life.

Supporting musicians on "Lustre Parfait" include Tom Keenlyside, Steve Madaio, Camille Henderson and Saffron Henderson.

Track listing

References

2023 albums
Gordon Downie albums
Arts & Crafts Productions albums
Albums published posthumously
Upcoming albums